Rosa Vilma Tuazon Santos-Recto (born November 3, 1953) is a Filipino actress, singer, dancer, TV host, producer, and politician. She served as a House Deputy Speaker from 2019 to 2022 and as the Representative of Batangas' 6th district from 2016 to 2022.

Her career as an actress has spanned more than five decades, beginning when she debuted as a child actress in the 1963 film Trudis Liit, for which she won her first FAMAS Award (Best Child Performer). She won the FAMAS Award for Best Actress for her dual role in Dama de Noche (1972). She has portrayed the superhero Darna in four films beginning with Lipad, Darna, Lipad! (1973). Santos produced Pagputi ng Uwak, Pag-itim ng Tagak (1978), which won both the FAMAS Award for Best Picture and the Gawad Urian for Best Film. In local media, she has been referred to as "Star for All Seasons" for the varied genres of her films and holds the titles of Grand Slam Queen, Queen of Queens, and the Longest Reigning Box Office Queen of Philippine Cinema. She was hailed as the enduring Grand Dame of the Philippine Film Industry by a foreign critic at the 2013 Toronto International Film Festival, the first Filipina actress to be bestowed such a tile.

Santos is also a prominent politician, and had served as governor of Batangas for three consecutive terms and as mayor of Lipa for also three consecutive terms. She was elected as the Representative for the Lone District of Lipa, Batangas in 2016. She was encouraged by various political parties to run for the Senate in 2019, but refused to do so.

Acting career
Vilma Santos is widely considered as the most lastingly successful Filipino film and television actress of all time. She was adjudged as the greatest movie actress of the Philippines for the years 2000 to 2020 by the Philippine Entertainment Portal for her continued portrayal of a wide range of award-winning roles as well as for being a consistent box-office draw despite being in the industry for nearly six decades. Vilma's venture into politics made her semi-retire from showbusiness in the late 1990's yet she still emerged as the actress with the most number of local best actress awards so far in the 21st century.

She started her acting career when one of her uncles, who was a cameraman at Sampaguita Pictures, convinced her to try out for the movies. Initially, Sampaguita Pictures had planned a child star role for her in Anak, Ang Iyong Ina (1963). When Santos was in the studio, she noticed a long line of little girls. Thinking that that line was the line for her audition, she decided to queue in. The long line turned out to be for an audition for Sampaguita Pictures' offering Trudis Liit (Little Trudis).

When it was her turn to audition, she was asked by the panel to sing, dance and cry on cue. She got the part of "Trudis Liit" for which she received the FAMAS Awards Best Child Performer award for 1963.

She was cast in Sa Bawat Pintig ng Puso (1964), Maria Cecilia (1965), Kasalanan Kaya? (1968), Iginuhit ng Tadhana (1965) and later in its sequel Pinagbuklod ng Langit (1969).

Political career

Mayor of Lipa City
In 1998, she entered politics and ran for mayor of Lipa City, Batangas where she won three consecutive elections, becoming the city's first female mayor.

In 2005, the University of the Philippines Diliman conferred on her the Gawad Plaridel Award for her achievements and contributions both as an actress and a public servant. In the same year she was conferred an honorary doctorate degree (honoris causa) in humanities by the Lipa City College. She was again honored in 2006 by UP Diliman as one of the four awardees in UP's First Diwata Awards.

Governor of Batangas

In 2007, Santos-Recto was on her third and final term as Mayor of Lipa and was barred for seeking another term. She became a reluctant candidate for Governor of Batangas as her brother-in-law, incumbent Vice Governor Richard Recto, is seeking the governorship.

On March 5, 2007, during the regular flag-raising ceremony at the Lipa City Hall, Santos-Recto ask for a week to decide if she will run or not. This was attended by thousands of her supporters not only in Lipa but from different towns in Batangas. On March 12, 2007, she made her final decision, running for Governor of Batangas despite having her brother-in-law as her rival, including incumbent governor Arman Sanchez and former police chief Nestor Sanares.

On the day of her filing of her candidacy, Richard Recto decided to withdraw his candidacy and run for congress instead.

Santos-Recto was proclaimed Governor-elect of the province of Batangas on May 21, 2007, after garnering 475,740 votes against incumbent Arman Sanchez's 344,969 becoming the first female governor of the province of Batangas. Governor Santos-Recto was reelected Governor of Batangas during the May 2010 elections defeating incumbent Santo Tomas Mayor Edna Sanchez, who substituted her husband Arman Sanchez who died on April 27, 2010, and again, reelected as Governor of Batangas during the May 2013 elections and her last term being a Governor.

Member, House of Representatives
After her election for her third and final term as Governor of Batangas, speculations circulated that Santos-Recto would run for the national level. However, she declined every offer to run for a higher level. She decided to run as the first representative of the newly formed 6th District of Batangas, would comprise only the City of Lipa. Santos-Recto won by a landslide, defeating Bernadette Sabili.

She became chairman of the Committee on Civil Service and Professional Regulation. However, she was removed from the post by the House leadership for her rejection of the reimposition of capital punishment. She is the vice chair of the Committee on Globalization and WTO and the Committee on Local Government. She is also a member of the committees on Basic Education and Culture, Cooperatives Development, Information and Communications Technology, Interparliamentary Relations and Diplomacy, Labor and Employment, Poverty Alleviation, Public Works and Highways, Southern Tagalog Development, Ways and Means, Welfare af Children, and Women and Gender Equality.

She is co-author of the SOGIE Equality bill (Anti-discrimination bill), Magna Carta for Day Care Workers, Maternity Leave Increase bill, Cancer Awareness bill, expanded Senior Citizens bill, and Post-graduate Education for Teachers bill.

In September 2018, she switched from the Liberal Party, where she was a member since 2009, to the Nacionalista Party.

On July 10, 2020, she is one of the 11 representatives who voted favor to grant ABS-CBN's legislative franchise. in which she supported the network's cause for the people and culture. ABS-CBN is also responsible for the restoration of some of her films as well as preservation, which includes Kapag Langit ang Humatol, Anak, Haplos, and Dekada '70.

Although she's eligible to run for a third term, and due to speculations that she might run for a national post, Santos-Recto decided not to seek another term, nor run in any position in the 2022 elections, due to the COVID-19 pandemic.

Personal life
Vilma Santos-Recto is married to Senator Ralph Recto. They have one son, named Ryan Christian. She also has one son, Luis Manzano from her previous marriage to Edu Manzano.

Filmography

Television

Film

Awards in television

1998 – Ading Fernando Lifetime Achievement Award – Star Awards for TV

Awards in film

1983 – FAMAS Medallion of Excellence (Child Actress)
1983 – FAMAS Medallion of Excellence (Lead Actress)
1983 – FAMAS Medallion of Excellence (Producer)
1989 – FAMAS Hall of Fame
1990 – PMPC Star Awards Darling of the Press
1990 – Gawad Urian Aktres ng Dekada '80 (Actress of the Decade '80)
1997 – FAP Lifetime Achievement Award
1998 – FAMAS Lifetime Achievement Award
1999 – PMPC Star Awards Special Citation for winning at the Brussels Int'l Film Festival
1999 – Natatanging Artista ng Taon
2000 – Gawad Urian Aktress ng Dekada '90(Actress of Decade '90)
2000 – Cinemanila Lifetime Achievement Award
2000 – Pelikula At Lipunan Special Award
2002 – Cinemanila Lifetime Achievement Award
2003 – S Magazine's Actress of The Year
2004 – Natatanging Gawad Tanglaw
2005 – PMPC Star Dekada Award in Acting
2005 – Feminist Centennial Filmfest – Outstanding Achievement in Film Acting
2005 – GAWAD PLARIDEL for Outstanding Achievement in Film
2005 – GMMSF All-Time Favorite Actress
2005 – Gawad Suri Award for Exemplary Film Practitioner
2006 – First Pioneer Filipino Animation Awards – for Darna, given by the United Animation Inc. and United Staffing Registry Inc.
2006 – University of the Philippines Diwata Awards
2008 – 25th PMPC Star Awards Lifetime Achievement Awardee
2008 – Fil-Am Visionary Legend Award
2009 – 7th ENPRESS Golden Screen Awards Lifetime Achievement Awardee
2009 – FAMAS Exemplary Achievement Awardee
2009 – Cinema One Original Filmfest Legend Award
2011 – Golden Screen Awards Movie Icon of our Time Awardee
2011 – Gawad Tanglaw Artista Ng Dekada
2012 – Yahoo Awards Major Impact
2014 – Cinema One Numero Uno Icon Award
2015 – NCCA Ani ng Dangal for Ekstra
2016 – FAMAS Presidential Award
2016 – FAP Golden Reel Award
2017 – PMPC Star Awards for Movies Ginintuang Bituin ng Penikulang Pilipino
2017 – Natatanging Gawad Urian
2019 – Gawad Pasado Best Actress Hall of Famer (Films Bata Bata Paano Ka Ginawa?,(1998), Anak (2000), Dekada 70 (2002), Everything About Her (2017)
2019 – PMPC Star Awards for Movies Natatanging Bituin ng Siglo
2019 – SPEED Awards for Movies – Eddys Icon Awards
2021 – PEP Greatest Movie Actress for the Years 2000-2021

Discography

Albums
2000 – Anak Soundtrack
2005 – Vilma (CD, collection of 23 songs)

Songs/covers
1969 – "Sixteen"
1969 – "Da Doo Ron Ron"
1969 – "Wonderful to Be in Love"
1969 – "I Saw Mommy Kissing Santa Claus"
1970 – "Breaking Up Is Hard to Do"
1970 – "Something Stupid"
1970 – "Bring Back Your Love"
1970 – "You're All I Want for Christmas"
1970 – "I Wonder Why"
1971 – "Abadaba Honeymoon"
1971 – "Bobby, Bobby, Bobby"
1971 – "Dry Your Eyes"
1971 – "Love, Love"
1971 – "It's Been a Long Long Time"
1971 – "Baby Cakes"
1971 – "I Love You Honey"
1971 – "Then Along Came You, Edgar"
1971 – "Mandolin in the Moonlight"
1971 – "Sealed with a Kiss"
1971 – "Tweddle Dee"
1971 – "Raindrops Keep Falling on My Head"
1971 – "Don't You Break My Heart"
1971 – "Wonderful World of Music"
1971 – "You Made Me Love You"
1971 – "The Birds and the Bees"
1972 – "Rick Tick Song"
1972 – "Sad Movies (Make Me Cry)"
1972 – "My Boy Lollipop"
1973 – "Palung-Palo Ako"
1973 – "Walang Umiibig"
1974 – "Tok Tok Palatok"
1974 – "Isipin Mong Basta't Mahal Kita"
1974 – "Batya't Palu Palo"
1974 – "Mamang Kutsero"
1976 – "Mga Rosas sa Putikan"

Awards in music

References

External links

1953 births
Living people
20th-century Filipino actresses
21st-century Filipino actresses
ABS-CBN personalities
Actresses from Batangas
Filipino actor-politicians
Filipino child actresses
Filipino women pop singers
Filipino film actresses
Filipino people of Spanish descent
Filipino television actresses
GMA Network personalities
Governors of Batangas
Lakas–CMD politicians
Liberal Party (Philippines) politicians
Mayors of places in Batangas
Members of the House of Representatives of the Philippines from Batangas
Kapampangan People
People from Lipa, Batangas
People from Tondo, Manila
Radio Philippines Network personalities
Recto family
Victor Records artists
Women mayors of places in the Philippines
Women members of the House of Representatives of the Philippines
Women provincial governors of the Philippines